Wyoming Highway 230 (WYO 230) is a  state highway in the U.S. State of Wyoming. The Route continues southeast in Colorado as Colorado State Highway 125, then it turns northeast as Colorado State Highway 127. At the Wyoming-Colorado State Line, WYO 230 resumes. WYO 230 then heads northeast towards Laramie to end at Business Loop I-80/US 30/US 287 in Laramie. WYO 230 provides a scenic and less-traveled alternative for travelers who want to avoid Interstate 80 and US 30 but cannot take WYO 130 which is closed in the winter.

Route description 
Wyoming Highway 230 basically crosses the same type of terrain as Wyoming Highway 130. At  there is a junction with Wyoming Highway 70 in the community of Riverside where route 70 heads west to Baggs and 230 turns southeast towards the state line. At the state line WYO 230 ends briefly and the roadway continues southeast into Colorado as SH 125.  into Colorado there is a junction with SH 127 north of Cowdrey, Colorado. SH 127 heads northeast approximately  back into Wyoming where that state highway ends and WYO 230 resumes. From there Wyoming 230 climbs again into the southeastern edge of the Snowy Range Mountains through mostly forested areas. At 51.8 miles (Wyoming State Highway miles) there is a junction with Wyoming Highway 10 in Woods Landing. Further east along the Highway 230, it the route descends into the Laramie Basin. Highway 230 meets WYO 130 just west of Laramie, and the two routes run together into Laramie as Snowy Range Road. (This is the only instance in Wyoming where two state routes are merged).

Major intersections

References

External links

Wyoming Routes 200-299
WYO 230 - I-80 Bus/US-30/US-287/WYO 130 to WYO 130 (see Wyoming 230)

Transportation in Albany County, Wyoming
Transportation in Carbon County, Wyoming
230